The American Journal of Therapeutics is a bimonthly medical journal covering advances in drug therapy, comparative effectiveness research, and post-marketing surveillance. The journal was established in 1994 by John Somberg MD and is published by Wolters Kluwer. The editor-in-chief since 2015 is Peter Manu MD,  Professor of Medicine at the Zucker School of Medicine at Hofstra/Northwell, Hofstra University, Hempstead, NY.

The journal has been part of the Web of Science Core Collection since 2010. According to the Journal Citation Reports, the journal has a 2020 impact factor of 2.688. The journal is included in the Index Medicus (MEDLINE).

References

External links

Pharmacology journals
Wolters Kluwer academic journals
Publications established in 1994
Bimonthly journals
English-language journals